Andrew Mercer (1829–1902) was Mayor of Dunedin 1873–1874.Mercer was born in Fifeshire in 1829. After an apprenticeship as a cabinetmaker, he arrived in Port Chalmers aboard the Philip Laing in 1848. According to an 1848 letter home, Mercer intended for his father and other family to join him. Mercer opened a grocery store on Princes Street in Dunedin, in partnership with George Ross, and then alone, and then with his son Hector. Mercer served seven years on the city council, and was a Justice of the Peace. He was elected mayor of Dunedin in 1873 and served one term.

He died in Dunedin on 6 June 1902.

References 

1829 births
1902 deaths
Mayors of Dunedin
New Zealand public servants
Scottish emigrants to New Zealand
Settlers of Otago
People from Fife